John Haywood Oxley (16 February 1850 – 4 July 1917) was an English first-class cricketer active 1882–83 who played for Middlesex. He was born in Kimberworth, Yorkshire; died in Sunbury-on-Thames.

References

1850 births
1917 deaths
English cricketers
Middlesex cricketers